Pierre-Marie-David Le Cadre (born in 1875 in Questembert) was a French clergyman and bishop for the Roman Catholic Diocese of Taiohae. He was appointed bishop in 1920. He died in 1952.

References 

1875 births
1952 deaths
French Roman Catholic bishops
Roman Catholic bishops of Taiohae